Melanella sarissa is a species of sea snail, a marine gastropod mollusk in the family Eulimidae.

Description 
The maximum recorded shell length is 3.2 mm.

Distribution and habitat 
Minimum recorded depth is 538 m. Maximum recorded depth is 538 m.

References

External links

sarissa
Gastropods described in 1927